Scènes de ménage , is a French comedy film from 1954, directed by André Berthomieu, written by Marcel Achard, starring Bernard Blier and Louis de Funès.
The scenario is based on three pieces by playwright Georges Courteline: "La peur des coups", "La paix chez soi", and "Les Boulingrin".

Plot
Three old friends meet again. They compare their marriages and tell each other stories which illustrate why they complain about their wives.

Cast 
 Bernard Blier as husband of Aglaé
 Louis de Funès as Monsieur Boulingrin, Ernestine's husband
 Sophie Desmarets as Aglaé
 Marie Daems as Valentine Trielle
 François Périer as the journalist Mr Trielle
 Marthe Mercadier as Ernestine Boulingrin
 Jean Richard as Monsieur des Rillettes
 Lily Bontemps as singer
 Solange Certain as the soubrette
 Michèle Philippe as Mathilde
 Paul Toscano and his orchestra

References

External links 
 
 Scènes de ménage (1954) at the Films de France

1954 films
French comedy films
1950s French-language films
French black-and-white films
Films directed by André Berthomieu
1954 comedy films
1950s French films